The 1927–30 Central European International Cup was the first edition of the Central European International Cup and was held between September 18, 1927 and May 11, 1930. The tournament's structure included a round-robin competition for the five teams involved. As the winner was to receive a Bohemian crystal cup offered by Prime Minister of Czechoslovakia Antonín Švehla, the tournament became known as the Antonín Švehla Cup.

Organizing committee
Sessions of the organizing committee took place on March 9, 1930 in Trieste and on March 11, 1930 in Budapest. The committee was composed by
 M. Ferretti, president 
 M. Fischer, vice-president 
 Hugo Meisl, secretary 
 Giovanni Mauro, technical expert

Events

1927
The tournament began on September 18, 1927 with the match Czechoslovakia-Austria, which ended 2–0. The following week, Austria was defeated once more in Budapest, Hungary, with a score of 5–3.
On October 23, in Prague, Italy's match against Czechoslovakia ended with a 2–2 draw. The last game of 1927 took place in Bologna between Italy and Austria, won 1–0 by Austria. The Austrian team complained in this occasion that the referee seemed not sufficiently impartial or fair.

1928
1928 opened with Italy's victory against Switzerland on January 1 in Genoa (3–2) and then, on March 25 in Rome, Italy succeeded in beating Hungary for the first time in history (4- 3). Each player on the Italian team was awarded a prize of 24,000 [Italian lira|lire]. On April 1, in Vienna, Austria lost 0–1 against Czechoslovakia; on April 22, in Budapest, the Czech team lost 2–0 to Hungary.
After a break to allow Switzerland and Italy to participate in the 1928 Summer Olympics in Amsterdam, the tournament resumed in the fall: Italy beat Switzerland (3–2); Austria wins 5–1 over Hungary  and 2–0 over Switzerland. The year ended with the victory of Hungary on Switzerland, on November 1, 3–1.

1929
On March 3, 1929 Italy beat Czechoslovakia 4–2, losing 3–0 to the Austrians barely a month later, on April 7, in Vienna. On April 14 Hungary beats Switzerland 5–4, and the Swiss team surrenders again to the Czechs (4–1) on 5 May. The two winning teams draw in the match (1–1) held in Prague on September 8. On October 6, Czechoslovakia beats Switzerland 5–0, and the Swiss's annus horribilis continues with a loss to Austria on October 27, on Bern's home turf. At year end, with Switzerland last after losing all eight games played, Austria and Czechoslovakia are tied with 10 points at the head of the tournament, followed by Italy and Hungary with 9 points each.

1930
The only game scheduled for 1930 was between Hungary and Italy. The match was played on May 11, 1930 in Budapest, and it is reported that Italy's trainer, Vittorio Pozzo brought his players to visit World War I battlefields before playing the last and decisive game of the tournament, perhaps wishing to bring back memories of their own participation, just 13 years earlier, in the fight against Austro-Hungarian soldiers. The team's crushing victory (5–0) brought Italy the first edition of the cup.

Final standings and Results

Matches

Winner

Statistics

Goalscorers

References

Central European International Cup